The Academy of Pharmaceutical Sciences, Pariyaram (APSC Pariyaram) (അക്കാദമി ഓഫ് ഫാർമസ്യൂട്ടിക്കൽ സയൻസസ്, പരിയാരം) is an educational institution in Kannur district, Kerala, India that provides various pharmacy courses such as Bachelor of Pharmacy, Pharm.D and Master of Pharmacy. This institution is approved by the Pharmacy Council of India and the All India Council for Technical Education. This institution was established in 2003 under Pariyaram Medical College.

References

Universities and colleges in Kannur district
Pharmacy schools in India
Medical colleges in Kerala
Pariyaram

2003 establishments in Kerala
Educational institutions established in 2003